Alexander Leon Gumuchian (born June 28, 1995), known professionally as bbno$ (pronounced "baby no money"), is a Canadian rapper, singer, and songwriter. He is best known for his 2019 single "Lalala" with producer Y2K, which has reached over 800 million plays on the streaming service Spotify as well as his collaborations with rapper Yung Gravy.

Early life 
Gumuchian was born in Vancouver, British Columbia, into an Armenian family. He was homeschooled before he began high school. While growing up, his mother had encouraged him to learn piano, but he had always struggled with music theory. Gumuchian claims that he was good with rhythm and that he enjoyed playing the djembe, but did not listen to music for recreation until the age of 15.

Career

2014–2016: Broke Boy Gang and SoundCloud 
Gumuchian started working with music after experiencing a back injury which prevented him from pursuing his dream as a professional swimmer. He became interested in rapping and music production in 2014 when experimenting on GarageBand with a group of friends. Gumuchian began simply making music for enjoyment with this group of friends who later deemed themselves Broke Boy Gang. After five or six months of performing live as a group and releasing multiple tracks online, the group broke up. He began posting tracks on SoundCloud in September 2016 under the moniker of "bbnomula" where he quickly gained millions of streams and followers. He gained popularity in China where he sold out his first few "back-to-back" headlining tours. He credited his overseas popularity to the Chinese dance crew TFBoys, after one of the members, Jackson Yee, danced to the track "Yoyo Tokyo" at his own birthday party.

2017–present 
In 2017, bbno$ released his first EP, Baby Gravy, as a collaboration with Yung Gravy, shortly before releasing his debut studio album, Bb Steps, and his second collaborative EP, Whatever, with So Loki in 2018.

In late 2019, bbno$ released his second studio album, Recess, which draws inspiration from the Disney series of the same name, and includes features from Y2K and Trippy Tha Kid. Many tracks off of Recess gained millions of streams on Spotify. bbno$ and Y2K have been recognized for marketing their single "Lalala" online by using various websites and online apps, namely Tinder, Instagram, TikTok, and Craigslist. The song was able to peak on over 20 charts around the world and gain over 400 million streams and 500,000 sales in the United States.

Later in 2019, bbno$ would go on to release another album, I Don't Care at All. The album featured various pre-released singles, "Slop", "Pouch", and "Shining on My Ex", the latter of which featured frequent collaborator Yung Gravy. The album was solely produced by Y2K.

On February 14, 2020, Baby Gravy 2 was released in collaboration with Yung Gravy. It serves as a sequel to the 2017 EP Baby Gravy.

The video for his single "Imma" features bbno$ in drag, travelling around Victoria with drag queen Jimbo.

On January 29, 2021, "Help Herself" was released. The song, produced by Diamond Pistols, served as the first single from a new bbno$ project.

Later in the year, on May 14, 2021, the five-song EP titled My Oh My was released. Three of the five songs, "Help Herself", "Bad to the Bone", and "Help Herself" (with Benee) had been released as singles prior to the EP releasing.

On July 24, 2021, "Edamame" featuring Rich Brian was released. This song was the first single from bbno$'s mixtape Eat Ya Veggies.

Shortly after the release of "Edamame", bbno$ started teasing a new album on Twitter. Following that, bbno$ released the second single from the project, titled "I Remember", on September 22, 2021.

On October 8, 2021, bbno$ released Eat Ya Veggies. The sixth track in the album, "u mad!", was included in the October 7, 2021 update of Counter-Strike: Global Offensive.

He released his first new single of 2022 on April 8, titled "Mathematics". The song was performed in March 2022 at his European shows, and the music video was teased during the Vancouver Canucks hockey game on April 4.

"Piccolo" was also first performed in March 2022 in Europe and in May 2022 during the Canada tour. The song is also known as "Dragon Ball Z" due to the lyric in the chorus "Dragon Ball Z dick, blow me like a piccolo". The song was teased on bbno$'s TikTok account on May 18, two days before it was released.

His single "Pogo" was released on June 24, 2022, and was produced by Diplo. Various snippets were teased on social media and the song title was confirmed during a Twitch live stream in April.

Bag or Die, bbno$'s most recent studio album, was released on October 21, 2022. It includes the singles "Mathematics", "Piccolo", and "Sophisticated", along with a collaboration with Yung Gravy, "touch grass".

Artistry 
bbno$ has described his own music as "oxymoronic rap" that is "ignorant but melodic". bbno$ grew up listening to straight bass dubstep and house music from names like Datsik and Excision, before listening to hip hop artists, namely Tupac Shakur, Gucci Mane, and Chief Keef. He has cited Yung Lean and Pouya as his main inspirations as a rapper.

Personal life 
bbno$ lives in Vancouver but has previously lived in Kelowna, where he received a degree in kinesiology at the University of British Columbia Okanagan in 2019.

Discography

Studio albums

Extended plays

Singles

Awards and nominations

Notes

References

External links 
 Official website

1995 births
Living people
Musicians from Vancouver
Canadian male rappers
Canadian people of Armenian descent
21st-century Canadian rappers
Underground rappers
University of British Columbia Faculty of Education alumni
Twitch (service) streamers
21st-century Canadian male musicians
Alternative hip hop musicians
Trap musicians